Mark Curry may refer to:

Mark Curry (actor) (born 1961), American actor and comedian
Mark Curry (television presenter) (born 1961), British television presenter
Mark Curry (rock musician), American singer-songwriter

See also
Mark Currie (disambiguation)